This article lists the confirmed national futsal squads for the 2003 UEFA Futsal Championship tournament held in Italy.

External links
UEFA.com

UEFA Futsal Championship squads
Squads